{{Infobox ethnic group
| group            = Pakistani Americans
| pop              = 654,202| popplace         = New York City Metropolitan Area, New Jersey, Baltimore-Washington Metropolitan Area, Philadelphia metropolitan area, Chicago Metropolitan Area, Houston metropolitan area, Los Angeles Metropolitan Area, San Francisco Bay Area, Boston, Atlanta, Phoenix metropolitan area, Dallas-Fort Worth, Florida, and major metropolitan areas throughout the United States
| langs            = 
| other languages  = 
| rels             = Predominantly Sunni Islam 
| image            = Americans with Pakistani Ancestry by state.svg
| image_caption    = American-Pakistanis by state according to the U.S. Census Bureau's American Community Survey (2015 - 2019)
}}Pakistani Americans''' are Americans who originate from Pakistan. The term may also refer to people who also hold a dual Pakistani and U.S. citizenship. Educational attainment level  and household income are much higher in the Pakistani-American diaspora in comparison to the general U.S. population.  In 2019, there were an estimated 954,202 self-identified Pakistani Americans, representing about 0.187% of the U.S. population, and about 2.50% of Asian Americans; more specifically, around 8% of South Asian Americans.

 History in the United States 

Immigrants from areas that are now part of Pakistan (formerly northwestern British India) and the Mughal Empire had been migrating to America as early as the eighteenth century, working in agriculture, logging, and mining in the western states of California, Oregon, and Washington. The passage of the Luce–Celler Act of 1946 allowed these immigrants to acquire U.S. citizenship through naturalization. Between 1947 and 1965, only 2,500 Pakistani immigrants entered the United States; most of them were students who chose to settle in the United States after graduating from American universities, according to reports from the U.S. Immigration and Naturalization Service. This marked the beginning of a distinct 'Pakistani' community in America. However, after President Lyndon B. Johnson signed the INS Act of 1965 into law, eliminating per-country immigration quotas and introducing immigration on the basis of professional experience and education, the number of Pakistanis immigrating to the United States increased dramatically. By 1990, the United States Census Bureau indicated that there were about 100,000 Pakistani Americans in the United States and by 2005 their population had grown to 210,000.

 Ethnic classification 
The classification of Pakistani Americans by the United States Census Bureau has historically been subject to change. For the purposes of the 1970 U.S. Census, all South Asians were originally considered white. For the purposes of the 2020 U.S. Census, Pakistani Americans were classified under Asian Americans by the U.S. Census Bureau.

Self Identity
In a study on the ethnic identification of South Asian Americans based on the 1990 U.S. Census, a sample of 299 Pakistanis living in the United States showed 6.7% identifying as white, where as 0.3% identified themselves as black, while the majority ascribed themselves to the Asian category. Pakistan is also home to several transnational ethnic groups which can be classified as white if originating within the confides of neighbouring countries. Such examples are Pashtuns and Baloch, who are also indigenous to Afghanistan and Iran, respectively.

 Demographics 

The U.S. Census Bureau estimates that there were 629,946 U.S. residents of Pakistani descent living in the United States in 2021. This is up from the number of people who reported as such in the 2010 United States Census, which was 409,163. Some studies estimate the size of the Pakistani community to be much higher and in 2005 research by the Pakistani embassy in the US found that the population numbered more than 700,000 people. Pakistan is the 12th highest ranked source country for immigration into the United States.

About half of Pakistani Americans are Punjabis, about 30% are Muhajirs, and the rest are made up of other ethnic groups from Pakistan, including Pashtuns, Balochis, Sindhis, Memons, and Kashmiris.
The most systematic study of the demography of Pakistanis in America is found in Prof. Adil Najam's book  'Portrait of a Giving Community', which estimates a total of around 500,000.

By state totals

This is a list of all 50 states in the U.S. and the District of Columbia ordered by the total estimated population claiming origin from Pakistan according to the 2018 American Community Survey.

 – 
 – 
 – 
 – 
 – 
 – 
 – 
 – 
 – 
 – 
 – 
 – 
 – 
 – 
 – 
 – 
 – 
 – 
 – 
 – 
 – 
 – 
 – 
 – 
 – 
 – 
 – 
 – 
 – 
 – 
 – 
 – 
 – 
 – 
 – 
 – 
 – 
 – 
 – 
 – 
 – 
 – 
 – 
 – 
 – 
 – 
 – 
 – 
 – 
 – 
 – 

By state concentration

This is a list of all 50 states in the U.S. and the District of Columbia ordered by the estimated concentration of the population claiming origin from Pakistan according to the 2018 American Community Survey rounded to the nearest thousandth of a percent.

 – 
 – 
 – 
 – 
 – 
 – 
 – 
 – 
 – 
 – 
 – 
 – 
 – 
 – 
 – 
 – 
 – 
 – 
 – 
 – 
 – 
 – 
 – 
 – 
 – 
 – 
 – 
 – 
 – 
 – 
 – 
 – 
 – 
 – 
 – 
 – 
 – 
 – 
 – 
 – 
 – 
 – 
 – 
 – 
 – 
 – 
 – 
 – 
 – 
 – 
 – 

New York City Metropolitan Area

The Greater New York City Combined Statistical Area, consisting of New York City, Long Island, and adjacent areas within New York State, as well as nearby areas within the states of New Jersey (extending to Trenton), Connecticut (extending to Bridgeport), and including Pike County, Pennsylvania, comprises by far the largest Pakistani American population of any metropolitan area in the United States, receiving the highest legal permanent resident Pakistani immigrant population. Within the greater metropolitan area, New York City itself hosts the largest concentration of Pakistani Americans of any U.S. city proper, with a population of approximately 34,310 as of the 2000 United States Census, primarily in the boroughs of Queens and Brooklyn. These numbers made Pakistani Americans the fifth largest Asian American group in New York City. As of 2006, this number had increased to 60,000 people of Pakistani descent said to be living in New York City. This figure additionally rises to a number between 70,000 when illegal immigrants are also included. Pakistan International Airlines served John F. Kennedy International Airport in Queens until 2017. While New York City has celebrated North America's largest Pakistan Day parade for decades, New Jersey's first annual Pakistan Day parade was held on August 16, 2015, in Edison and Woodbridge, New Jersey.

California
Silicon Valley counts highly educated and skilled workers from Pakistan most of whom work in the Information Technology, software development, and computer science sectors, and it has been estimated that some 10,000 Pakistanis work in the Silicon Valley. From 1990 - 2000 the Pakistani population in the San Francisco Bay Area increased to 6,119 which is an increase of 76%.

Historically pre-dating the modern state of Pakistan, Muslims from the British Raj immigrated in waves starting in 1902 to the west coast, most notably in Yuba City, California, in search of jobs in mining and logging. Some of the oldest American Muslim communities, and largest Sikh ones in America, exist in Yuba City today.

Chicago
Devon Avenue has a street named after the founder of Pakistan Muhammad Ali Jinnah as well as Mahatma Gandhi to accommodate both the Indian and Pakistani business there.

Texas
There is a large Pakistani population in Texas, estimated at around 70,000 people in 2018. They are primarily concentrated around the metropolitan areas of Austin, Dallas and Houston (in the three County areas of Harris, Montgomery and Fort Bend).

The community is made up of professionals involved in medicine, IT, engineering, large businesses involved in textiles, manufacturing, real estate, management and also smaller ones such as travel agencies, motels, restaurants, convenience stores and gas stations.

Other cities
Newly arrived Pakistani immigrants mostly settle in cities like New York City, Paterson, New Jersey, Los Angeles, Atlanta, Boston, San Diego, San Francisco, Chicago, Denver and Detroit; like other South Asians, Pakistanis settle in major urban areas. The Pakistani American community are also prevalent in Arizona, Arkansas,  Colorado, Connecticut, Georgia, Louisiana, Massachusetts, Michigan, Nevada, New England, New Mexico, Ohio, Oklahoma, Oregon, Seattle, Virginia, Washington, D.C., Wisconsin and Utah. Fremont, California has the most Pashtuns in the United States, with many of them emigrating from Pakistan.

Towns and cities in America with the highest percentage of Pakistani ancestry include Madison Park, New Jersey (5.7%), Herricks, New York (4.1% ), Boonton, New Jersey (4%), Lincolnia, Virginia (3%), Stafford, Texas (2%) and Avenel, New Jersey (2%).

 Culture 

Like the terms "Asian American" or "South Asian American", the term "Pakistani American" is also an umbrella label applying to a variety of views, values, lifestyles, and appearances. Although Pakistani Americans retain a strong ethnic identity, they are known to assimilate into American culture while at the same time keeping the culture of their ancestors. Pakistani Americans are known to assimilate more easily than many other immigrant groups because they have fewer language barriers (English was an official language of Pakistan and widely spoken in the country among professional classes), more educational credentials (immigrants are disproportionately well educated among Pakistanis), and come from a similarly diverse, relatively tolerant, and multi-ethnic society. In addition to national identity, many Pakistani Americans also identify with their ethnic group (i.e. Punjabi Americans, Pashtun Americans, Balochi Americans, Sindhi Americans, etc).

Pakistani Americans are well represented in the fields of medicine, engineering, finance and information technology. Pakistani Americans have brought Pakistani cuisine to the United States, and Pakistani cuisine has been established as one of the most popular cuisines in the country with hundreds of Pakistani restaurants in each major city and several similar eateries in smaller cities and towns. There are many Pakistani markets and stores in the United States. Many of such establishments cater to a broader South Asian audience due to similarities in cuisine. Some of the largest Pakistani markets are in New York City, Central New Jersey, Washington, D.C., Chicago, Dallas and Houston.

Languages
Pakistani Americans often retain their native languages, such as Urdu. As English is an official language in Pakistan and is taught in schools throughout the country, many immigrants coming to the United States generally have an ability to speak the English language.

Many Pakistanis in the United States speak some of Pakistan's various regional languages such as Punjabi, Saraiki, Sindhi, Balochi, Pashto and Kashmiri.

Religion
Most Pakistani Americans are Muslims. Religion figures prominently in many Pakistani American families.

The majority of Pakistanis belong to the Sunni sect of Islam, although there is a significant representation of the Shi'ite and Ahmadiyya sects. In smaller towns in America where there may not be mosques within easy access, Pakistani Americans make trips to attend the nearest one on major religious holidays and occasions. Pakistani Americans worship at mosques alongside other Muslims who might trace their ancestry to all parts of the Islamic world; there are generally no separate Pakistani American mosques.

Pakistani Americans also participate in and contribute to the larger Islamic community, which includes Arab Americans, Indian Americans, Iranian Americans, Turkish Americans, Azerbaijani Americans, African Americans, Indonesian Americans, Malaysian Americans, Bosnian Americans, Albanian Americans, Bangladeshi Americans, and many more ethnic backgrounds in America. They are part of the larger community's efforts to educate the country about the ideals of Islam and the teachings of Mohammed. Pakistani Americans have played important roles in the association the Muslim Students Association (MSA), which caters to the needs of Islamic students across the United States. MSA is affiliated with the Islamic Society of North America and Islamic Circle of North America which are both considered offshoots of the MSA. Pakistani Americans have significantly contributed to both organizations.

Although most Pakistani Americans are Muslims, there are also Hindus, Christians, and Zoroastrians within the community. Pakistani Christians, like Asian Christians, worship at churches all over the country and share in the religious life of the dominant Christian culture in America. Pakistani Hindus mainly share in the religious life of numerous Hindus from various nationalities, such as Indian American Hindus. Pakistani Hindus are mostly from Karachi. In recent times, Pakistani Zoroastrians (called Parsis) have come to the United States mainly from the cities of Lahore and Karachi. Apart from fellow Pakistanis, they also congregate with fellow Zoroastrian co-religionists from Iran.

Music

Notable contributions
Pakistani Americans have made many contributions to the United States in many fields, such as science, politics, military, sports, philanthropy, business and economy.

Business and finance
Shahid Khan is a Pakistani American billionaire businessman who is owner of an auto-parts company and an NFL team Jacksonville Jaguars. As of 2012, he was estimated to have a net worth exceeding $6 billion and is featured on the Forbes 400 list of richest Americans, on which he ranks 179. Overall on the Forbes list of billionaires, he is the 491st richest person in the world.

Philanthropy

The Pakistani American community is said to be philanthropic, research shows that in the year 2002 the community gave close to US$1 Billion in philanthropic activities (including value of volunteered time). Since the Pakistani diaspora has spread internationally over the years, many Pakistanis living abroad choose to donate time, money and talent to further development in Pakistan. Pakathon, for example, aims to empower Pakistanis through innovation, technology and entrepreneurship.

Military

Pakistani American soldiers make up a sizable proportion of the over 4,000 Muslim service members in the US military. As of February 2008, 125 Pakistan-born service members were on active duty in the US Armed Forces, out of the 826 US service members born in South-Central Asia. This figure refers to those who were naturalized with US citizenship and does not include US-born service members of Pakistani ancestry.

Pakistani American service members have assisted with US intelligence operations, and worked as interpreters, interrogators and liaison officers in Afghanistan. Their knowledge of local languages such as Pashto and Dari gives them an edge in coordination activities.

 Cpt. Humayun Saqib Muazzam Khan was a Pakistani American soldier who posthumously received the Bronze Star and Purple Heart military decorations. He was killed in Iraq and buried at the Arlington National Cemetery. Khan's parents, Khizr and Ghazala Khan, appeared at the 2016 Democratic National Convention to challenge Donald Trump's views on Muslims.
 Another Pakistani American who received both a Bronze Star and Purple Heart was Kareem Rashad Sultan Khan who died in Iraq. Others have served in different capacities, such as working as military commissaries abroad.
 Naveed Jamali is an intelligence officer in the United States Navy Reserve.
 Atif Qarni is a former U.S. Marine who served for eight years, including in Iraq; he is a Democrat politician who was appointed as the 19th Virginia Secretary of Education.

Entertainment
 Shayan Khan is an actor and film producer

Sports
 Gibran Hamdan is an American football quarterback, who is the first player of Pakistani descent to play in the NFL.
 Mustafa Ali is the first wrestler of Pakistani descent to compete for the WWE.

 Socioeconomics 

Occupation and income

The Pakistani American community generally lives in a comfortable middle-class, upper-middle-class and upper-class lifestyles. Many Pakistani Americans follow the residence pattern set by other immigrants to the United States that when they increase their wealth, they are able to own or franchise small businesses; including restaurants, groceries and convenience stores, clothing and appliance stores, petrol and gas stations, newspaper booths, and travel agencies. It is common to include members of the extended and immediate family in the business.

Members of the Pakistani community believe in the symbolic importance of owning homes; accordingly, Pakistani Americans tend to save money and make other monetary sacrifices earlier on in order to purchase their own homes as soon as possible. Members of the family and sometimes the closer community tend to take care of each other, and to assist in times of economic need. Hence, it would be more common to turn to a community member for economic assistance rather than to a government agency. This leads to relatively low use of welfare and public assistance by Pakistani-Americans. According to the 2000 census, the mean household income in the United States in 2002 was $57,852 annually, whereas for Asian households, which includes Pakistanis this was $70,047. A separate study conducted by the American Community Survey in 2005, showed the mean and median incomes for Pakistani male full-time workers were US$59,310 and US$42,718 - respectively compared to the average male American full-time workers' mean and median incomes of US$56,724 and US$41,965 - respectively. A 2011 report based on data from the 2010 US Census reported the median household income of Pakistani-American families at $63,000, which was considerably higher than the American family income average of $51,369.

There is also incidence of poverty in the Pakistani community and in particular around the growing number of new immigrants that migrated from less privileged backgrounds in Pakistan. These migrants tend to take low-paying jobs involving manual or unskilled labor and tend to live in large cities where such jobs are readily available and in particular New York, where as of the 2000 census, poverty rates for Pakistanis in relation to the total New York population were higher overall, with 28% of Pakistanis living in poverty, which is greater than the general New York City poverty rate of 21%. Compared with those immigrants that arrived from 1965 who were either professionals or students and considered to be middle- and upper-class, the newer migrants tended to be worse off economically.

Education
According to American Factfinder, Pakistani Americans are high achievers academically and tend to be better educated as compared to other heritage groups in the United States with 89.1% being at least high school graduates  and about 54% holding a bachelor's degree or higher professional degree. Additionally it was found that over 30% of Pakistani Americans hold graduate or professional degrees.

Physicians

An increasing number of Pakistani Americans work in the medical field. The Association of Physicians of Pakistani Descent of North America, APPNA, has been meeting in various locations across the United States for the past 30 years. There are more than 17,000 doctors practicing medicine in America who are of Pakistani descent. Pakistan is the fourth highest source of IMG doctors in the U.S. and they are chiefly concentrated in New York, California, Florida, New Jersey and Illinois. Pakistan is also the fourth highest source of foreign dentists licensed in the United States. US congressmen and congresswomen have lauded the contributions of Pakistani medical professionals to the country's healthcare system.

 Labor 

This table shows the areas of work that Pakistanis are employed in and compares people that are born in the U.S., those born in Pakistan and those who are American nationals:

The New York Times estimated that there were 109,300 workers born in Pakistan in all occupations in the US in 2007. With the top 10 occupations in ascending order being; sales-related, managers and administrators, drivers and transportation workers, doctors, accountants and other financial specialists, computer software developers, scientists and quantitative analysts, engineers and architects, clerical and administrative staff, and teachers.

 Discrimination 
Since the September 11 attacks in 2001, Pakistani Americans began reporting incidents of discrimination, especially in places such as airports. After the September 11 attacks, some Pakistani Americans started identifying themselves as Indians (Pakistan was created through the partition of India in 1947).

 Politics 

Since the second wave of immigration in 1965, the Pakistani American community has not been politically inclined, but this is now changing, with the community starting to contribute funds to their candidates of choice in both parties, and running for elected office in districts with large Pakistani American populations. In recent times, Pakistani American candidates have run for the state senate in districts of such city boroughs as Brooklyn, New York. Because the community is geographically dispersed, the formation of influential voting blocs has not generally been possible, making it difficult to for the community to make an impact on politics in this particular way. However, there are increasing efforts on the part of community leaders to ensure voter registration and involvement.  In 1989, observing the need for greater political coordination, activism and advocacy, a group of Pakistani Americans founded The Pakistani American Political Action Committee (PAKPAC).

Historically, Pakistani Americans have tended to vote Republican due to the shared ideology of conservatism and the perceived notion that Republican Presidents and leaders are more pro-Pakistani than Democrats. This was evident during the 2000 Presidential Election, as Pakistani Americans voted in overwhelming numbers for Republican candidate George W. Bush. That trend reversed itself in 2004, after George W. Bush's first term in office. His policies alienated Muslims at home and abroad, and Pakistanis were no exception. When George W. Bush was up for re-election, Pakistani Americans voted for Democratic candidate John Kerry. Former Pakistan diplomat Mohammed Sadiq (diplomat) helped establish the internship program at the Pakistan Embassy in Washington, D.C.  Mr. Sadiq also helped the Pakistani American community organize and launch the Pakistan Caucus in Capitol Hill.

In the past, especially during the Cold War and the War on Terror under the Bush administration, there was the perceived notion that Republicans were more pro-Pakistani than Democrats. However, that trend reversed itself from 2011 onwards. Since then, there has been an increasing anti-Pakistani sentiment among Republican congressman which has alienated some Pakistani-Americans. Some Republican presidential candidates have criticised the Democrats policy toward Pakistan. During the 2012 Republican Party presidential debates, the Republican candidates questioned whether the United States could trust Pakistan. Texas governor Rick Perry called Pakistan unworthy of US aid because it had not done enough to help fight al-Qaeda. In the same year a bill was introduced by Dana Rohrabacher in the US House of Representatives proposing a hefty reduction in aid to Pakistan. President Obama has vowed to veto any proposed anti-Pakistan bills. President Obama also courted the Pakistani-American community for votes and money for his 2012 re-election campaign. In March 2012, Obama traveled to Houston, Texas for this purpose and at a dinner organised by Pakistani entrepreneurs, the President managed to raise $3.4 million in just a few hours for his re-election campaign. President Obama also pledged to continue sending aid and selling military equipment to Pakistan. According to polls, most Pakistani-Americans have now switched their votes to the Democratic Party.

In 2013, during the second inauguration of Barack Obama, the re-elected President praised the members of the Pakistani community in America and said, “I am about to go speak to the crowd in Chicago, but I wanted to thank you first. I want you to know that this was not fate and it was not an accident. You made this happen.” Talking to the Daily Times via telephone, US business leader Muhammad Saeed Sheikh said Obama in his address told that he would spend the rest of his presidency honoring the Pakistani-American support and doing what he can to finish what he started. Obama continued his praise and said, "You organised yourselves block by block. You took ownership of this campaign 5 and 10 dollars at a time. And when it was not easy, you pressed forward."

In the 2016 presidential election, a majority of Pakistani Americans (88%) voted for Hillary Clinton. A exit poll conducted by AALDEF showed that an overwhelming majority (89%) of Pakistani Americans backed Joe Biden in the 2020 presidential election.

In January 2019, Sadaf Jaffer became the first female Pakistani-American mayor, the first female Muslim American mayor, and the first female South Asian mayor in the United States, of Montgomery in Somerset County, New Jersey.

In January, 2021, Ali Zaidi (lawyer) became the first deputy White House National Climate Advisor serving in the Joe Biden administration.  

In March, 2021, President Biden nominated Dilawar Syed to serve as Deputy Administrator of the Small Business Administration.

In June, 2021, Lina Khan became the Chair of the Federal Trade Commission.

 Relations with Pakistan 

Pakistani Americans have always maintained a strong bond with their homeland. No airlines are allowed to fly nonstop to the US from Pakistan, but several Arab airlines fly indirectly between the two nations, carrying with them thousands of Pakistanis who mostly go home to visit family and relatives. The relationship between the U.S. and Pakistani governments in the past few decades has not been very close, and the Pakistani American community has benefited from this American interest in the country of their origin. Pakistani TV channels have found their way into homes of the diaspora worldwide.

Several paid TV channels are available for viewing; Pakistani TV serials, reality TV shows and political talk shows are popular among expatriates. These channels can also be viewed on the internet. Pakistani Americans maintain a deep interest in the society and politics of their country of origin. Funds are raised by the community in the US for various political parties and groups in Pakistan. From all the Pakistani diaspora, Pakistani Americans raised the largest number of funds to help Pakistan due to the 2005 earthquake. Tensions among ethnic groups like the Sindhis, Punjabis, Pashtuns, and Baluchis in Pakistan are not reflected in interaction between these subgroups in the US.
Several international airlines serve the growing Pakistani community in the US connecting major US airports to those in Pakistan.

The Pakistani community in the United States also remits the largest share of any Pakistani diaspora community since 2002/03, surpassing those from Saudi Arabia which from 2000/01 were $309.9 million and increased to $1.25 billion by 2007/08 and during the same period remittances from the United States increased from $73.3 million to $1.72 billion.

In 2012 the Election Commission of Pakistan granted Overseas Pakistanis the right to vote in future Pakistani general elections. By allowing the setting up of polling stations in embassies and consulates, this move was welcomed by those Pakistanis living abroad particularly in America who stated "Overseas Pakistanis make enormous contributions to the development of Pakistan".Pakistani-Americans hail voting rights move March 1, 2012

 In American popular culture 
 Nadia Ali is a Grammy Award-nominated singer-songwriter, prominent in electronic dance music and the voice of iiO's 2001 single "Rapture", which dominated dance charts across the world.
 In the comedy television series Silicon Valley, Dinesh Chugtai is the lead software engineer in the fictional tech company Pied Piper. He is originally from Islamabad and is often seen speaking Urdu and making remarks about his homeland. Dinesh has a sarcastic personality and is known for his frequent quarrels with co-worker Bertram Gilfoyle. The character is played by Pakistani-American actor Kumail Nanjiani.
 In the sitcom Seinfeld, Babu Bhatt is a Pakistani immigrant befriended by Jerry Seinfeld in the episode "The Cafe". He appears again in "The Visa", in which he moves into Jerry's building, but Babu is deported to Pakistan due to Jerry not giving him his immigration paperwork (which was mistakenly delivered to his mailbox).
Mr. Capone-E is a rapper from San Gabriel Valley in Los Angeles, California. 
 Nadia Yassir, a character on the hit TV show 24, portrayed a fictional Pakistani American.
 In 2007, The CW aired the comedy series Aliens in America. The show is about a Wisconsin family that hosts a Pakistani exchange student.
 Faran Tahir is a Pakistani-American actor who has appeared in American television shows such as 24, Monk, and Justice. He also starred as the captain in the 2009 Star Trek film.
 Iqbal Theba is a Pakistani-American actor who played Principal Figgins on Glee  
 The latest character in Marvel Comics to take up the mantle of Ms. Marvel is Kamala Khan, a Pakistani American in the Millennial Generation (Generation Y). Her character and comic (of which she is the title character) have received critical acclaim, along with being a commercial success. A Ms. Marvel TV series was released, with Pakistani-Canadian actress Iman Vellani playing the title character. Vellani will reprise the role in the film The Marvels.
 The Kominas are a Boston-based Pakistani American band, prominent in the punk and taqwacore scenes, appearing in the documentary film Taqwacore in 2009.
 The fourth season of the American thriller television series Homeland takes place in Islamabad, Pakistan. 
 The American comedy television series The Brink focuses on a geopolitical crisis in Pakistan.
 The American military drama television series Last Resort is set in Pakistan.
 Madam Secretary first season's episode three is based on a diplomatic crises with Pakistan.
 The 2016 HBO miniseries The Night Of revolves around a Pakistani-American family based in Queens, New York.
Dilshad Vadsaria is a Pakistani-American actress who played Rebecca Logan on the ABC Family television program Greek Events 
Pakistan day flag raising events are held throughout the US around August 14 every year.
Pakistan Independence Day Parade: The event is held every year around August 14 (the date Pakistan was established in 1947) in New York City
The First International Urdu Conference was held in the United Nations Headquarters in New York in June 2000. The conference was organized by Urdu Markaz New York.
APPNA Conference: This event is organized every year by APPNA (Association of Pakistani Physicians in North America).  The conference attracts hundreds of Pakistani American physicians and their families from all over North America. APPNA's doctors have also volunteered their time and services for a free health care event taking place throughout June 2010.
Pakistan Independence Day Festival of Battery Park: This is the largest gathering of Pakistani Americans in United States which was founded by a political and social activist, Khalid Ali.
In April 2010, the USA Cricket Association signed a deal with the Pakistan Cricket Board (PCB) to host games in America. The PCB said that they had reached an agreement with the USA Cricket Association and anticipated games starting in 2010. This is also due to the large Pakistani American and Pakistani expatriate community residing in the United States.

 Notable people 

See also

 Overseas Pakistani
 Baloch Americans
 Pashtun Americans
 Punjabi Americans
 Sindhi Americans
 Americans in Pakistan
 Pakistan–United States relations

Notes and references

Further reading
 Malik, Iftikhar Haider. Pakistanis in Michigan: A Study of Third Culture and Acculturation (AMS Press, 1989).
 Mosbah, Aissa, Ahmed Mukt Abdhamid Abusef, and Salah Belghoul. "Migration and Immigrant Entrepreneurship among Pakistanis: An Assessment of the State of Affairs." Journal of Management and science, 15.2 (2017): 45–53. online
 Najam, Adil. Portrait of a Giving Community: Philanthropy by the Pakistani American Diaspora (Harvard University: Global Equity Initiative, 2007).
 Pavri, Tinaz. "Pakistani Americans." Gale Encyclopedia of Multicultural America, edited by Thomas Riggs (3rd ed., vol. 3, Gale, 2014), pp. 425–436. online
 Taus-Bolstad, Stacy. Pakistanis in America (Lerner Publications, 2006).
 Williams, Raymond Brady. Religions of Immigrants from India and Pakistan: New Threads in the American Tapestry'' (Cambridge University Press, 1988). online review

External links
  Center for Pakistan Studies, Middle East Institute

 
Asian-American society
Pakistani diaspora in the United States
Pakistani American
America
South Asian American